Clayton Fernandes Silva (born 11 January 1999), simply known as Clayton, is a Brazilian footballer who plays as a forward for Portuguese club Casa Pia, on loan from Vila Nova.

Club career
Born in Belo Horizonte, Minas Gerais, Clayton played amateur football before initially joining  in January 2019. In March, however, after never signing a deal with the club, he moved to Lajeadense, and initially played for the under-20 side before making his first team debut later in the year.

On 19 December 2019, Clayton was presented at Juventude, after a partnership with Lajeadense was established. He appeared rarely before moving to Série D side Guarany de Sobral the following September, where he was a regular starter.

Ahead of the 2021 season, Clayton signed for Globo, and helped his side to win the Campeonato Potiguar by scoring ten goals. On 29 June of that year, he joined Vila Nova in the Série B.

Clayton featured regularly for Vila, and renewed his contract until 2024 on 18 February 2022. Just hours later, Série A side Coritiba announced his signing on a loan deal until December.

On 26 July 2022, Clayton moved abroad for the first time in his career, after signing a one-year loan deal with Primeira Liga newcomers Casa Pia.

Career statistics

Honours
Globo
Campeonato Potiguar: 2021

References

External links
Futebol de Goyaz profile 

1999 births
Living people
Footballers from Belo Horizonte
Brazilian footballers
Association football forwards
Campeonato Brasileiro Série A players
Campeonato Brasileiro Série B players
Campeonato Brasileiro Série D players
Clube Esportivo Lajeadense players
Esporte Clube Juventude players
Guarany Sporting Club players
Globo Futebol Clube players
Vila Nova Futebol Clube players
Coritiba Foot Ball Club players
Primeira Liga players
Casa Pia A.C. players
Brazilian expatriate footballers
Brazilian expatriate sportspeople in Portugal
Expatriate footballers in Portugal